Home Front is a 2020 French drama film directed by Lucas Belvaux. It was selected to be shown at the 2020 Cannes Film Festival.

Cast
 Gérard Depardieu as Feu-de-Bois
 Catherine Frot as Solange
 Jean-Pierre Darroussin as Rabut

References

External links
 

2020 films
2020 drama films
2020s French-language films
French drama films
Films directed by Lucas Belvaux
Films postponed due to the COVID-19 pandemic
2020s French films